National Integration Party (Partido de Integración Nacional) can refer to:

 National Integration Party (Colombia)
 National Integration Party (Costa Rica)
 National Integration Party (Guatemala)
 National Integration Party (Peru)